100th Regiment of Foot may refer to regiments of the British Army:
100th Regiment of Foot (1760), raised in 1760
100th Regiment of Foot (Loyal Lincolnshire Regiment), raised in 1780
92nd (Gordon Highlanders) Regiment of Foot, raised as the 100th (Gordon Highlanders) in 1794 and renumbered as the 92nd in 1798
100th Regiment of Foot (Prince Regent's County of Dublin Regiment), raised in 1804 and renumbered as the 99th in 1816
New South Wales Corps, renumbered from the 102nd in 1816
100th (Prince of Wales's Royal Canadian) Regiment of Foot, raised in 1858